Bryndle was an American folk-rock band first formed in the late 1960s in Los Angeles.

The original lineup consisted of singer-songwriters Andrew Gold, Karla Bonoff, Kenny Edwards (founding member of The Stone Poneys), and Wendy Waldman.
with several instrumentalists joining them for recordings or concerts over the years.

History
In 1970, Bryndle recorded sessions for an album for A&M Records, with Peter Bernstein and Dennis Wood playing bass and drums, respectively. Newcomer producer Chuck Plotkin worked with the group, but their would-be debut album never materialized. Only one track, Bonoff's "Woke Up This Morning", was released as a single, briefly becoming a regional hit in northern California but failing to win a wider audience. With little to show for their considerable time and effort, the discouraged group disbanded.

Waldman, Bonoff, Gold, and Edwards each established solo careers and undertook session work in the 1970s and 1980s, and each worked closely with Linda Ronstadt in this time period. Edwards, who had been a founding member of the Stone Poneys prior to the formation of Bryndle, recorded and toured with Ronstadt for about ten years beginning in the mid-1970s. Gold was a key member of Ronstadt's backing band for several years. Waldman became a friend of Ronstadt and also toured with her for a period; they collaborated on a song, "I Want a Horse", for the 1980 Sesame Street LP In Harmony. Bonoff was one of many songwriters whom Linda Ronstadt introduced via covers on her albums, notably "Someone to Lay Down Beside Me".

In the early 1990s, Bryndle re-formed with its original quartet of Bonoff, Gold, Edwards and Waldman. In 1995, their newly recorded debut album, Bryndle, was released, and the band began a tour of the US and Japan, adding drummer Scott Babcock (who also recorded with them on the new album) and bassist Bill Bonk. In 1996, core member Gold left the band and briefly moved to the East Coast with his family. Bryndle, now essentially a trio, continued touring through 1997, with Matt Cartsonis replacing Bonk (who left to work with Aimee Mann) in the touring band.

After the tour, the four singer-songwriters took a break from the road, and all of them became busy with their solo careers. Work on a second Bryndle album proceeded slowly over the next five years with much of the songs written and recorded separately, unlike their more collaborative 1995 album. The trio focused on completing the new album in 2001 with contributions from former member Andrew Gold.  Bryndle would, performing two house concerts during this period. House of Silence was finally released in early 2002.

With the album released, Bryndle once again became inactive as a band, and its members returned to other solo and group projects. Sadly, Edwards died in August 2010, aged 64, closely followed by Gold in June 2011, aged only 59.

Discography

Bryndle (album)

Track listing
All songs written by Bryndle, except where noted.

Personnel
Bryndle (Karla Bonoff, Kenny Edwards, Andrew Gold, Wendy Waldman) – vocals, instruments
Eddie Bayers – drums, percussion
Leland Sklar – bass
Scott Babcock – percussion
Bob Carpenter – accordion
James Ross – viola

House of Silence

Track listing

Personnel
Karla Bonoff – vocals, piano, keyboards, acoustic guitar
Kenny Edwards – vocals, acoustic, electric, slide and baritone guitars, mandolin, bass, piano, keyboards
Wendy Waldman – vocals, acoustic, electric and high string guitars, keyboards, mandolin, piano, organ, dulcimer
Andrew Gold – vocals, electric and high string guitar, keyboards, organ, bass, fiddle, programming
Scott Babcock – drums, percussion
Martin Cartsonis – bass

References

Folk rock groups from California